H43 Lund is a handball team from Sweden. The club played in the Elitserien but after bankruptcy in 2014 they no longer exist. The youth club under the same name is a new club founded in 2015 under same short name (but not same full name) The club was founded in 1943 in a school class in Lund. Their teacher Y. Wallmer helped the boys found the club at a local café. 13 years later the club was playing in Sweden's highest division. H43 Lund played in "allsvenskan" for 14 years 1956-1970 before they were relegated to the second division. After nine years they were back in the top division but now only for seven years. In 2000 H43 Lund was back in "Elitserien" and stayed there for 12 years. During 2012/13 H43 played one year in division 2 but then came back. Economic bankruptcy in 2014 ended the history of the club. Former it was called "Lunds handbollsklubb av år 1943" now it is "H43 Lunds handbollsklubb".  The club had to start in the bottom again and now the men are playing at the 4th level and so do the ladies.

Sports Hall information

Name: – Bollhuset Lund
City: – Lund
Capacity: – 150
Address: – Fasanvägen 2, 227 32 Lund, Sweden

Kits

References

External links
  
 

Swedish handball clubs
Sport in Lund
1943 establishments in Sweden
Handball clubs established in 1943
Sport in Skåne County